Miloš Petrović (October 18, 1952 – November 13, 2010) was a Serbian and Yugoslav musician, composer, music educator and writer.

Petrović graduated from the Belgrade Faculty of Music in 1974. From 1974 to 1980 he performed with the jazz group Interaction, and in 1980 he formed the jazz band Jazzy, with which he released two albums. Simultaneously, he was a member of the rock group Jakarta, with which he recorded two albums and gained nationwide popularity. He started his career in classical music in 1985, recording an album of harpsichord pieces. After gaining a magister degree from the Belgrade Faculty of Music in 1988, he dedicated himself to composing. He published a number of classical and ethnic jazz albums and took part in several jazz projects.

Petrović was a professor at the Belgrade Faculty of Music, where he taught harpsichord and chamber music. He published two novels, a book of short stories and a book of essays.

Biography

Early career
Miloš Petrović was born in 1952 in Belgrade municipality Zemun. He graduated from the piano department of the Belgrade Faculty of Music in 1974. During the same year, he started his career playing in the jazz group Interaction, led by saxophonist Paul Pignon. He performed with Interaction until 1980.

Jazzy and Jakarta
In 1980, Petrović formed the jazz band Jazzy with bassist Rade Bulatović and percussionist Nenad Jelić. With Jazzy, he recorded two albums, Jazzy (1983) and Wake Up and Jazzy (1986). A number of musicians from Belgrade worked with Jazzy during the nine years of its activity. The group split up in 1989.

Simultaneously with his work in Jazzy, Petrović was a member of the rock band Jakarta. He joined Jakarta in 1983, recording two albums with them, the synth-funk oriented Maske za dvoje (Masks for Two, 1984), which brought them nationwide popularity, and power pop-oriented Bomba u grudima (Bomb in the Chest, 1986). He remained the member of Jakarta until its dissolution in 1988.

Solo career and cooperations
Petrović started his solo career in 1985, with the album Dela Baha i Ramoa (The Works of Bach and Rameau), on which he played harpsichord. During the same year, with violinist Nenad Milošević, flutist Svetlana Tošić and cellist Tešman Živanović he recorded the album Baroque Trio Sonatas, featuring pieces by Vivaldi, Telemann, Loeillet and Bach. Three years later, he gained magister degree from the Belgrade Faculty of Music.

In 1991, he released the album Istorija Vizantije No.1 (History of Byzantine Empire No.1), which featured his compositions for prepared piano inspired by Byzantine music. The album inner sleeve featured accompanying short stories written by Petrović. In 1993, with percussionist Veljko Nikolić, better known by his stage name Papa Nick, he released the avant-garde jazz album Levantinci (Levantines). In 1994, he released the ethnic jazz album Istorija Vizantije 2, which featured numerous guest musicians: Rade Bulatović (bass), Vladeta Kandić (accordion), Bata Božanić (bass), Luka Bošković (drums), Nenad Petrović (saxophone), Papa Nick (percussion), and others. In 1996, he published the double album Srpska muzika za čembalo (Serbian Music for Harpsichord), with harpsichord pieces inspired by traditional music of Serbia. During the same year, with Papa Nick and Greek musician Floros Floridis he recorded the album Syrtis Major. In 1998, he released two albums with the band Južni kvartet (South Quartet), The Past Continuous and Around Balkan Midnight. At the end of 1990s, he participated in the Levant Music project, consisting of him, Papa Nick, bassist Mihajlo "Miša" Blam and vocalist Vladana Marković. They released the album Rolling Sun (2000), recorded on their concert in Belgrade Ethnographic Museum. In 2001, he released his last album, Levantino, which he recorded with the Bertollino string quartet, consisting of Katarina Milenković (violine), Aleksandar Gajić (violine), Đorđe Pantelić (viola) and Tešman Živanović (cello). The album featured material composed by Petrović and Gajić.

Other activities
Petrović taught harpsichord and chamber music at the Belgrade Faculty of Music.

He published two novels, Žitije Mardarija Monaha (Life of Mardarije the Monk, 1992) and Mihajlo iz Peći (Mihajlo from Peć, 1997), and a book of short stories Levant nad Levantom (Levant over Levant, 1996). In 2010, just several weeks before his death, his book of essays on jazz entitled Dlanom o stopalo (Palm across the Foot) was published.

Death
Petrović died in Belgrade on November 13, 2010, after long illness.

Discography

With Jazzy

Studio albums
Jazzy (1983)
Wake Up and Jazzy

With Jakarta

Studio albums
Maske za dvoje (1984)
Bomba u grudima (1986)

Singles
"Amerika" / "Put u bajano" (1983)
"Spiritus" / "Problem" (1984)
"Osvojiću svet" / "Osvojiću svet – Instrumental" (1985)

Solo

Studio albums
Dela Baha i Ramoa (1985)
Baroque Trio Sonatas (1985)
Istorija Vizantije No.1 (1991)
Levantinci (1993)
Istorija Vizantije 2 (1994)
Srpska muzika za čembalo (1996)
Syrtis Major (1996)
Levantino (2001)

Compilation albums
Istorija Vizantije 1 i 2 (2019)

With Južni kvartet

Studio albums
The Past Continuous (1998)Around Balkan Midnight (1998)

With Levant Music
Studio albumsRolling Sun'' (2000)

References

External links
 

1952 births
2010 deaths
Serbian composers
Serbian musical theatre composers
Serbian rock keyboardists
Serbian electronic musicians
Serbian songwriters
Yugoslav composers
Yugoslav musicians
Performers of Byzantine music
Musicians from Belgrade
University of Arts in Belgrade alumni